Simon Evans (born 9 May 1965) is an English comedian.

Early life

Evans attended Verulam School in St Albans and then studied law at Southampton University, graduating in 1986.

Stand-up comedy
Evans is an established UK comedian with his own BBC Radio 4 series Simon Evans Goes to Market, and with numerous TV appearances to his name. He was on Live at the Apollo (January 2013) and was a weekly regular on Stand Up for the Week (Autumn 2013, Channel 4). TV appearances have also included Michael McIntyre's Comedy Roadshow in Sunderland (BBC One, 2010) and Edinburgh Comedy Fest Live (BBC Three, 2010).

A prolific live act, Evans toured his show Fringe Magnet in 2010–11, Friendly Fire 2011–2012, then Leashed which debuted at the Edinburgh Fringe in August 2013. In 2018 Evans toured his show Genius which garnered four-star reviews at Edinburgh in 2017 and was described in The Scotsman as an "extraordinarily accomplished hour… a masterclass in socio-political comedy".

In early 2010 Evans supported Lee Mack on his UK tour Going Out, and as a writer has made a long running contribution to Mack's BBC sitcom Not Going Out.

He has performed one-man shows at the Edinburgh Festival Fringe since 2000 and at the New Zealand Comedy Festival 2002, Cape Town Comedy Festival 2001 as well as in Hong Kong, Singapore, Shanghai, Beijing, Winnipeg and Dubai. In July 2004 he performed at the Just for Laughs festival in Montreal, and the following spring at the Aspen Comedy Festival in Colorado. Since July 2010 when he appeared alongside Emo Philips at Latitude Festival in Suffolk he has returned to Latitude on several occasions.

In early 2018, after an appearance on BBC Radio 4's The News Quiz, Evans was referred to by Rod Liddle in The Spectator as a right-wing comedian. Dominic Maxwell in The Times (26 March 2018) described Genius as an intelligent, reliably funny show that nods to everything from John Ruskin to PornHub to Ivan Turgenev's two-kilo brain' and notes that 'Evans has fun with the right and the left'.

Evans also makes regular contributions in a slightly more serious vein, as a regular guest on current affairs TV shows (such as The Big Questions and Andrew Neil's This Week) as well as on live radio, such as Radio Five's Afternoon Edition. He was also part of the comedians' team on University Challenge: The Professionals (BBC Two) – being beaten by eventual series winners the Ministry of Justice – and has won Celebrity Mastermind (BBC One): his specialist subject was Ernest Shackleton.

Evans is also a regular columnist for the British Internet magazine Spiked.

Television writing
Evans has written for TV shows including:
 The Big Breakfast
 Lily Savage
 Johnny Vaughan Tonight
 Look at the State We're In'
 TV Heaven, Telly Hell The Late Edition They Think It's All Over Revolver Eight out of Ten Cats Turn Back Time Not Going OutTelevision appearances
Evans has appeared on The Comedy Store (Five) and The Stand Up Show (BBC1). Evans's other television include shows on the Comedy Network, and appearances on Five's Company (Five) and as a contestant on The Krypton Factor.

 Brain Candy (BBC Choice) (2002)
 The Way It Is (BBC1) (2000)
 Edinburgh Nights (BBC2)
 The Comedy Store (Five)
 The Stand Up Show (BBC1)
 Gas (Channel 4)
 Life's a Pitch (BBC1) (2000)
 The Comedy Network (Five)
 Five's Company (Five)
 Take a Girl Like You (2000)
 Rich Hall's Cattle Drive (2006) as Melvin Turpin
 Michael McIntyre's Comedy Roadshow (BBC1) (2010)
 Dave's One Night Stand (Dave) (2011)
 Mock the Week (BBC2) (2011)
 Dara Ó Briain: School of Hard Sums (Dave) (2012)
 Live at the Apollo (BBC1) (2013) (2014)
 The Big Questions (BBC1) (21 January 2018)
 Question Time (BBC1) (2 May 2019)
 Headliners (GB News) (2021)

Radio
Evans appears regularly on BBC Radio 4 – hosting and writing seven series of the spoof news show The Way It Is (as Richard Richard), as well as appearing on numerous panel games including The News Quiz, Armando Iannucci's Charm Offensive and The Unbelievable Truth, and discussion programmes such as Off the Page.

He is a regular contributor to both BBC Radio 4 and London Live and has had full-length comedy scripts commissioned by the BBC for both TV and radio.

 The Way It Is (Radio 4) – Writer and performer
 Best Policy (Radio 4) – Anchored
 True Lies, A world without... and others (Radio 4) – Pundit/panellist
 Beating the System (Radio 4) – Sole writer and performer
 Troublestarter (Radio 4) – Three part series – Sole writer and performer
 The Mighty Boosh (Radio 4) – Performer
 The News Quiz (Radio 4) – Performer
 The Big Booth (Radio 4) – Performer
 Simon Evans Goes To Market'' (Radio 4)

References

External links
 

1965 births
Living people
People from Luton
Alumni of the University of Southampton
English male comedians
English screenwriters
English male screenwriters
English stand-up comedians
English male television actors
GB News newsreaders and journalists
20th-century English comedians
21st-century English comedians